Saidi Ramadhani Bwanamdogo (15 December 1968 – 22 January 2014) was a Tanzanian CCM politician and Member of Parliament for Chalinze constituency from 2010 until his death at age 45 in January 2014.

References

1968 births
2014 deaths
Chama Cha Mapinduzi MPs
Tanzanian MPs 2010–2015
Minaki Secondary School alumni
Mazengo Secondary School alumni
University of Dar es Salaam alumni